Honored Artist of the Azerbaijan SSR was an honorary title awarded by the Presidium of the Supreme Soviet of the Azerbaijan Soviet Socialist Republic (Azerbaijan SSR) and was one of the forms of recognition by the state and society of the merits of distinguished citizens. The awards were issued from January 13, 1929 to June 2, 1990; and there were more than 600 recipients.

List of honored artists 

 1929, Gurban Pirimov
 1929, Abbas Mirza Sharifzadeh
 1931, Sidgi Ruhulla
 1939, Yaver Kelenterli
 1940, Ahmad Anatolly
 1956, Fatma Mehraliyeva
 1958, Gambar Zulalov
 1959, Khumar Zulfugarova
 1960, Nasiba Zeynalova
 1960, Sattar Bahlulzade
 1961, Maria Titarenko
 1969, Osman Hajibeyov
 1974, Samandar Rzayev
 1975, Talat Bakikhanov

References 

Azerbaijan